Mud District is a district (bakhsh) in Sarbisheh County, South Khorasan Province, Iran. At the 2006 census, its population was 11,803, in 3,517 families.  The District has one city: Mud. The District has two rural districts (dehestan): Mud Rural District and Naharjan Rural District.

References 

Districts of South Khorasan Province
Sarbisheh County